Omm ol Safayeh may refer to:
 Omm ol Safayeh 1
 Omm ol Safayeh 2